Morley Markson is a Canadian industrial designer, film director and cinematographer from Toronto, Ontario. He is most noted for his 1974 film Monkeys in the Attic, which was a Canadian Film Award nominee for Best Picture at the 26th Canadian Film Awards in 1975, and his 1988 documentary film Growing Up in America, which was a Genie Award nominee for Best Feature Length Documentary at the 10th Genie Awards in 1989.

His 1971 film Breathing Together: Revolution of the Electric Family was a selection of the International Critics' Week at the 1971 Cannes Film Festival.

Filmography 

 Exploration (1967)
 Kaleidoscope (1967)
 America Simultaneous: The Electric Family (1968)
 Electrocution of the World (1968)
 Eyebang (1968)
 Light Year (1968)
 Retinal Capsule (1968)
 Zero (1968)
 The Tragic Diary of Zero the Fool (1969)
 Breathing Together: Revolution of the Electric Family (1971)
 Monkeys in the Attic (1974)
 Off Your Rocker (1982)
 Growing Up in America (1988)

References

External links 
 
 

Canadian documentary film directors
Living people
Canadian cinematographers
Canadian experimental filmmakers
Canadian industrial designers
Canadian video artists
Film directors from Toronto
Artists from Toronto
Year of birth missing (living people)